Khalissi may refer to:

Mehdi Al-Khalissi
Khaleesi, Game of Thrones